The Alexander Dennis Enviro300 (previously known as the TransBus Enviro300) is a light-weight full-size single-decker bus that was built by Alexander Dennis and its predecessor TransBus International between 2001 and 2015. The design was the first of the new Enviro range of buses from TransBus and also the first bus to be built as an integral bus by TransBus.

The Enviro300 was introduced in order to fill a gap in the manufacturer's product range. At the beginning the Cummins ISBe220 5.9-litre Euro III engine was provided as standard, but for Euro IV and V, the engine was the 6.7-litre ISBe with 225 hp for Euro IV and 225 or 250 hp for Euro V. There was a choice of 3 gearboxes: ZF Ecomat (originally 5HP502C, then 6HP504C), Allison T280R and Voith DIWA 854.5 (originally DIWA854.3E). The second generation Enviro300, with front end redesigned to match the Enviro200 and Enviro400, was launched in 2007.

Production of the Enviro300 ceased in 2015 with the introduction of a long-wheelbase Enviro200 MMC. More than 1,000 complete buses were produced.

First generation (2001–2008)

The TransBus Enviro300 was launched in 2001 by TransBus International, becoming the first member of the Enviro range; with the collapse of TransBus in 2004, successors Alexander Dennis took over production and rebranded the Enviro300 as the Alexander Dennis Enviro300. In 2005, a school bus version was launched.

A common design was used primarily that the bus has a single-curvature windscreen with a peaked roof dome and a separately mounted destination sign. The bus was developed to compete with the European-built heavy-weight single-decker buses sold in the United Kingdom, the most notable being Volvo. Many full-size (12m or more) single-decker buses are primarily designed for use on the continent and to carry a large number of standing passengers which is commonplace on the continent, but the Enviro300 was designed solely for the UK market where large numbers of standing passengers are not often carried. TransBus therefore believed that operators could make significant fuel savings by operating light-weight buses and produced a vehicle which is claimed to be lighter than its continental rivals but offer more seating capacity.

The Enviro300 had not sold as well as the manufacturer had hoped, though sales were not helped by the collapse of TransBus International in 2004. First Midland Red purchased 35. Arriva purchased at least 40. A small number of original style Enviro300s were sold to Stagecoach Group, Cardiff Bus and Bus Éireann.

The Enviro300 chassis was also able to be fitted with bodywork by other manufacturers, with Courtney Coaches purchasing East Lancs Esteem bodied examples in 2006. This was the first time the Enviro300 chassis being constructed with bodywork by another manufacturer.

Second generation (2007–2015)

In late 2007 Alexander Dennis introduced a second generation version of Enviro300 which featured styling cues similar to the Enviro200 Dart and the Enviro400. It had a single-piece windscreen covering the destination display (no longer a peaked roof dome similar to the Marshall Capital and the MCV Stirling). It was also available on MAN 18.240/18.250 and Volvo B7RLE chassis. The second generation Enviro300 was far more successful sales wise than its predecessor, with Arriva, FirstGroup and Stagecoach purchasing examples.

Stagecoach ordered 100 Enviro300 bodied MAN 18.240s in 2007 Further orders boosted the total number to over 350. In mid-2008 Ulsterbus ordered 45 Enviro300 bodied Volvo B7RLEs, which were the first to feature Volvo chassis since the introduction of this option, they were also built to a rural specification featuring unusual modifications such as narrower entrance doors, side wheelchair access door and 55 seatbelted seats in the form of 2+3 layout.

In January 2011, Stagecoach placed an order for 50 Enviro300s on the diesel-powered Scania K230UB chassis. These were followed by further 28 examples in 2012/13 and 28 in 2014/15.

In April 2013 Reading Buses took delivery of 20 gas-powered Enviro300SG buses based again on a Scania K UB chassis. These buses were jointly developed by Alexander Dennis and Scania, who had a demonstrator on loan to other operators from March 2013. Stagecoach North East purchased 40 Scania K270UBs in 2014.

Production of the Enviro300 ceased in late 2015 with the introduction of a long-wheelbase variant of the new Enviro200 MMC. The final Enviro300s were delivered to Stagecoach Merseyside & South Lancashire in December 2015.

In the UK in 2019, DVSA (Driver & Vehicle Standards Agency) issued an instruction to all operators of the Enviro 300 to carry out additional safety checks of suspension components following several safety concerns raised by DVSA. ADL are expected to implement a number of technical measures and recalls to resolve these issues.

References

External links

Product description on Alexander Dennis official website

Enviro300
Bus chassis
Full-size buses
Hybrid electric buses
Low-entry buses
Low-floor buses
Vehicles introduced in 2001